John Edmands may refer to:

John Edmands (librarian) (1820–1915), American
J. Wiley Edmands, U.S. Representative

See also
John Edmunds (disambiguation)
John Edmonds (disambiguation)